Denicos Allen (born August 9, 1990) is a former American football linebacker. He played college football for the Michigan State from 2010 to 2013, winning a Rosebowl in 2013 and played professional football with the Saskatchewan Roughriders in 2015.

College football
A native of Ohio, Allen played college football at Michigan State from 2010 to 2013, registering 278 total tackles. He helped lead the 2013 Michigan State Spartans football team to a Big Ten Conference championship and a victory over Stanford in the 2014 Rose Bowl.

Professional football
Allen played in 4 preseason games for the Tampa Bay Buccaneers in 2014 before being cut.  He was signed to their practice squad on November 25, 2014.

He played for the Saskatchewan Roughriders of the Canadian Football League in 2015, appearing in three games, two as a starter, and registering 17 tackles.

References

External links
Tampa Bay Buccaneers bio

1990 births
Living people
American football linebackers
Tampa Bay Buccaneers players
African-American players of American football
Sportspeople from Hamilton, Ohio
Players of American football from Ohio
Michigan State Spartans football players
Saskatchewan Roughriders players
21st-century African-American sportspeople